The 2022 European Trampoline Championships was held from 1 June to 5 June 2022 in Rimini, Italy.

Medal summary

Seniors

References

2022 in gymnastics
2022
International gymnastics competitions hosted by Italy
2022 in Italian sport
June 2022 sports events in Italy
Rimini